Davar Khoshnevisan (born 21 July 1964) is an American mathematician. 

Khoshnevisan completed bachelor's and master's degrees in mathematical sciences at Johns Hopkins University and a doctorate at the University of California, Berkeley, advised by Warry Millar. Khoshnevisan began his teaching career at the Massachusetts Institute of Technology. After one year, he joined the University of Wisconsin–Madison faculty. In 1993, Khoshnevisan moved to the University of Utah. Khoshnevisan was elected a fellow of the Institute of Mathematical Statistics in 2015, and awarded an equivalent honor by the American Mathematical Society in 2020.

References

Mathematicians from Massachusetts
Mathematicians from Wisconsin
Mathematicians from Utah
Living people
20th-century American mathematicians
1964 births
21st-century American mathematicians
Johns Hopkins University alumni
Massachusetts Institute of Technology faculty
University of Wisconsin–Madison faculty
University of California, Berkeley alumni
Fellows of the American Mathematical Society
Fellows of the Institute of Mathematical Statistics